a passenger railway station in the city of Katori, Chiba Japan, operated by the East Japan Railway Company (JR East).

Lines
Omigawa Station is served by the Narita Line, and is located 52.7 kilometers from the terminus of line at Sakura Station.

Layout
The station consists of dual opposed side platforms connected by a footbridge to a wooden, single-story station building. The station has a Midori no Madoguchi staffed ticket office.

Platforms

History
Omigawa Station was opened on November 10, 1931 as a station on the Japanese Government Railway (JGR) for both freight and passenger operations. After World War II, the JGR became the Japan National Railways (JNR). Scheduled freight operations were suspended from February 1, 1974. The station was absorbed into the JR East network upon the privatization of the Japan National Railways (JNR) on April 1, 1987.

Passenger statistics
In fiscal 2019, the station was used by an average of 1,185 passengers daily (boarding passengers only).

Surrounding area
 
Tone River
Omigawa High School

See also
 List of railway stations in Japan

References

External links

JR East station information 

Railway stations in Japan opened in 1931
Railway stations in Chiba Prefecture
Narita Line
Katori, Chiba